DeMarcus Walker (born September 30, 1994) is an American football defensive end for the Chicago Bears of the National Football League (NFL). He played college football at Florida State and was drafted by the Denver Broncos in the second round of the 2017 NFL Draft.

Early years
Walker attended Sandalwood High School in Jacksonville, Florida. He originally committed to the University of Alabama to play college football but changed to Florida State University.

College career
As a true freshman at Florida State in 2013, Walker played in 12 games and made three starts. He finished the year with 18 tackles and one sack. As a sophomore in 2014 he played in all 14 games with 11 starts, recording 38 tackles and one sack. As a junior in 2015, Walker started all 13 games, recording 58 tackles and 10.5 sacks. During the first game of his senior season in 2016, he recorded 4.5 sacks.  On October 8, 2016, he sealed FSU's 7th win in a row against in-state rival Miami by blocking Miami's game tying PAT, known now as the "Block at the Rock"!

Professional career
Walker received an invitation to the NFL Combine, but chose to only perform the bench and produced 18 reps. He participated at Florida State's Pro Day and completed all the combine drills. Walker said he didn't perform them at the combine because he wanted to have more time to get into better shape. He was projected to be a second or third round pick by the majority of draft experts and analysts. Walker was ranked the 10th best defensive end by NFLDraftScout.com, the 15th best defensive end by Sports Illustrated, and ranked the 11th best defensive end in the draft by ESPN.

Denver Broncos

The Denver Broncos selected Walker in the second round (51st overall) of the 2017 NFL Draft. On May 15, 2017, the Broncos signed Walker to a four-year, $5.07 million contract with $2.52 million guaranteed and a signing bonus of $1.83 million.

On September 23, 2020, Walker was placed on injured reserve with a calf injury. He was activated on October 24.

Houston Texans
Walker signed with the Houston Texans on April 16, 2021. He was placed on injured reserve on December 4, 2021. He was activated on December 25.

Tennessee Titans
On May 16, 2022, Walker signed with the Tennessee Titans.

Chicago Bears
On March 15, 2023, Walker signed a three-year, $21 million contract with the Chicago Bears.

References

External links
Tennessee Titans bio
Florida State Seminoles bio

1994 births
Living people
Sportspeople from Jacksonville, Florida
Players of American football from Jacksonville, Florida
American football defensive ends
Florida State Seminoles football players
Denver Broncos players
All-American college football players
Houston Texans players
Tennessee Titans players
Chicago Bears players